Petro Didyk (14 July 1960 – 1 May 2015) was a Ukrainian football defender and football functionary.

Career
Didyk played in the clubs of different levels in the Western Ukraine. Also he played in Poland and Kazakhstan. After retiring from playing career in age 40, he became football functionary in the Ternopil Regional Football Federation.

He died in hospital in Zalishchyky from injures sustained in traffic collision.

Honours

 Kazakhstani Premier League Winner: 1997

References

External links

Statistic at ukr-football.org.ua

1960 births
2015 deaths
Ukrainian footballers
Soviet footballers
Ukrainian expatriate footballers
Expatriate footballers in Poland
Expatriate footballers in Kazakhstan
Kazakhstan Premier League players
FC Nyva Ternopil players
FC Halychyna Drohobych players
FC Irtysh Pavlodar players
FC Tobol players
Association football defenders